Hadar Yosef (lit. Glory of Joseph) is a residential neighborhood of Tel Aviv, Israel, in the northeastern part of the city. The neighborhood is located to the north of the Yarkon River and near the National Sport Center – Tel Aviv.

History 
Hadar Yosef was established in 1946. The Ten Windmills Bridge (today Hadar Yosef Bridge) was built at the end of 1930s by the British Mandate government as part of a road connecting Kiryat Shaul, Ramat HaSharon and Herzliya to Tel Aviv. The neighborhood is named for Yosef Elisar who purchased the land.

The northern border is Mivtsah Kadesh street, with Bnei Ephraim to the west, Pinhas Rozen to the east and Shitrit street to the south. Neighboring neighborhoods are Shikun Dan, Neot Afeka A, Maoz Aviv, Kiryat Atidim, Ramat HaHayal and the Yarkon River. Most of the streets are named after Jewish communities destroyed in  the Holocaust, among them Odessa, Warsaw, Lvov, Budapest, Luz, Bialystok, Chernov and Yassy. There were 7,190 people living in Hadar Yosef in 2014, many of whom worked in the neighboring Kiryat Atidim and Ramat HaHayal.

The headquarters of the Israel Gymnastics Federation are at 2 Shitrit Street, Hadar Yosef.

References

Neighborhoods of Tel Aviv